This is a list of known American football players who have played for the Tonawanda Kardex of the National Football League in 1921. It includes players that have played at least one match with the team.



B
"Backnor",
Fred Brumm

C
"Cassidy"

G
Art Georke

H
Clarence Hosmer

K
Rudy Kraft, 
George Kuhrt

M
Buck MacDonald,
Tom McLaughlin, 
Bill Meisner

P
Frank Primeau

R
Tam Rose

S
Bill Sanborn

T
Charlie Tallman

W
Red Werder

References
Tonawanda Kardex 1921 roster

Tonawanda Kardex players
Ton